Willard Wadsworth Rice (April 21, 1895 – July 21, 1967) was an American ice hockey player who competed in the 1924 Winter Olympics.

Rice was born in Newton, Massachusetts the son of Abbott Barnes Rice, a Massachusetts legislator, and Amy Thurber (Bridges) Rice.  He was a graduate of Harvard University in 1922.  Rice played hockey with the Boston Athletic Association team in the 1920s and 1930s that played at the Boston Arena. He was a member of the American ice hockey team in the 1924 Winter Olympics that won the silver medal. Rice had a career as an executive with a soap manufacturing company.  He died in Weston, Massachusetts on 21 July 1967.

Notes

1895 births
1967 deaths
American men's ice hockey left wingers
Harvard University alumni
Ice hockey players from Massachusetts
Ice hockey players at the 1924 Winter Olympics
Medalists at the 1924 Winter Olympics
Olympic silver medalists for the United States in ice hockey
Sportspeople from Newton, Massachusetts